Oldehove may refer to:

 Oldehove, Groningen, a village in the Netherlands
 Oldehove, Leeuwarden, a neighbourhood of Leeuwarden, the Netherlands
 Oldehove (tower), a tower in Leeuwarden